Dinosaur is a 2000 American live-action/computer-animated adventure film produced by Walt Disney Feature Animation, The Secret Lab and released by Walt Disney Pictures. The 39th Disney animated feature film, the film was directed by Ralph Zondag and Eric Leighton (in the latter’s directorial debut), it features the voices of D.B. Sweeney, Alfre Woodard, Ossie Davis, Max Casella, Hayden Panettiere, Samuel E. Wright, Julianna Margulies, Peter Siragusa, Joan Plowright and Della Reese, it follows a young Iguanodon who was adopted and raised by a family of lemurs on a tropical island. After surviving a devastating meteor shower, the family moves out for their new home and befriends a herd of dinosaurs along the way while on a journey to the "Nesting Grounds". However, they face harsh circumstances with its Darwinistic leader while being hunted down by numerous predators, such as Carnotaurus.

The initial idea was conceived in 1986 by Phil Tippett and Paul Verhoeven, which they conceived as a darker, naturalistic film about dinosaurs. The project underwent numerous iterations with multiple directors attached. In 1994, Walt Disney Feature Animation began development on the project and spent several years developing the software to create the dinosaurs. The characters in Dinosaur are computer-generated. However, most of the backgrounds are live-action and were filmed on location. A number of backgrounds were found in various continents such as the Americas and Asia; various tepuis and Angel Falls also appear in the film. With a budget of $127.5 million, Dinosaur was reportedly the most expensive computer-animated film at the time.

Dinosaur was released on May 19, 2000 to mixed reviews from critics, who praised the film's opening sequence, soundtrack and animation, but criticized the story for its lack of originality. The film grossed $350 million worldwide, becoming the fifth highest-grossing film of 2000. It became the fourth best-selling home video release of 2001, selling 10.6 million copies and garnering $198 million in sales.

Plot

A Carnotaurus attacks a mixed-species herd of dinosaurs, destroying an Iguanodon nest before killing a Pachyrhinosaurus. The lone surviving Iguanodon egg is stolen by an Oviraptor, and after a series of mishaps, arrives at an island inhabited by prehistoric lemurs, and hatches. Plio, the daughter of lemur patriarch Yar, names the baby Aladar and raises him alongside her daughter Suri, despite Yar's initial objections.

Several years later, a fully grown Aladar watches the lemurs take part in a mating ritual, in which Plio's awkward teenaged brother Zini fails to do so. Moments after the ritual ends, they are interrupted by a meteor crashing into the Earth, creating an explosive shockwave which destroys the island. Aladar and Yar's family flee across the sea to the mainland. Being the only survivors, they mourn the others, before moving on.

While crossing the burnt deserted wasteland, they are attacked by a pack of Velociraptors. They escape by joining a multi-species herd of dinosaur refugees heading for the communal Nesting Grounds. Falling afoul of callous Iguanodon herd leader Kron, they retreat to the end of the line and befriend the old Styracosaurus Eema, her pet Ankylosaurus Url who acts like a dog, and her equally elderly friend Baylene, a Brachiosaurus who is the last of her kind. They travel for days without water to the site of a lake, only to find it seemingly dried up. Kron orders the herd to move on and let the weakest perish, but Aladar stays behind with a sick Eema. He and Baylene dig until they find some water for them. The rest of the herd follows suit, and Kron's sister Neera, impressed by Aladar's compassion, begins to grow closer to him, while Kron fears he wants to take over.

Meanwhile, two Carnotaurus have been tracking the herd. Kron's Altirhinus lieutenant Bruton reports the approaching predators, after surviving an attack during a scouting mission. Kron quickly ushers the herd away from the lake, deliberately leaving Aladar, the lemurs, the elderly dinosaurs, and the injured Bruton behind, hoping that they will slow their pursuers down. Aladar and Neera are against this, but Kron considers Aladar a threat, silences him and forces Neera to leave him. The abandoned group takes shelter in a cave as night falls, but the predators catch up to them and attack. Bruton sacrifices himself to cause a cave-in that kills one of the Carnotaurus, forcing the survivor to retreat.

The group ventures deeper into the cave, but they reach a dead end. Though Aladar briefly loses hope, Baylene uses her strength to smash through the wall, and they arrive at the Nesting Grounds on the other side. Eema notices that a landslide of rocks has blocked off the usual entrance to the valley. Aladar rushes off to warn Kron, and finds him forcing the herd to climb over the landslide, unaware of the sheer drop on the other side. Kron stubbornly attacks Aladar, while attempting to retrieve his leadership and takes his warnings, but Neera intervenes on Aladar's behalf. She and the herd follow Aladar, while Kron tries to climb the rocks by himself.

The hungry Carnotaurus arrives, but Aladar rallies the herd to stand together and roar at it. Outnumbered, the Carnotaurus backs off, and attacks Kron instead. Aladar and Neera rush to save him, but fail to get there in time. Aladar manages to push the Carnotaurus over the edge of a cliff, to its death. He and Neera mourn Kron, then lead the herd to the Nesting Grounds. Sometime later, a new generation of dinosaurs hatches - among them Aladar and Neera's children - and the lemurs find more of their kind.

Voice cast
 D. B. Sweeney as Aladar, a young brave, determined and compassionate Iguanodon, who is adopted by a family of lemurs, and helps the herd of dinosaurs migrate and survive. He is the adopted son of Plio, grandson of Yar, nephew of Zini and elder brother of Suri. He later becomes a leader of the herd, replacing Kron. 
 Alfre Woodard as Plio, a wise Archaeolemur who cares for her family. She is the daughter of Yar, elder sister of Zini, mother of Suri and the adoptive mother of Aladar.
 Ossie Davis as Yar, an Archaeolemur, whose occasional gruff demeanor is just a front covering his compassionate nature. He is the father of Plio and Zini, maternal grandfather of Suri, and adoptive maternal grandfather of Aladar.
 Max Casella as Zini, a wisecracking and somewhat hapless teenage Archaeolemur, who fancies himself a ladies man. He is the brother of Plio, son of Yar, and maternal uncle of Suri and (by adoption) Aladar.
 Evan Sabara voices Zini as a child. 
 Hayden Panettiere as Suri, a sweet, fun-loving young Archaeolemur. She is Aladar's adoptive younger sister, Plio's daughter, Zini's niece, Yar's granddaughter, and finally the adoptive paternal aunt of Aladar and Neera's children (at the end of the film). 
 Samuel E. Wright as Kron, the Altirhinus leader of the herd of survivors and the brother of Neera. Being the animal equivalent of a social Darwinist, he is arrogant and insecure, and he has little regard for the lives of the weak. After being abandoned by the herd, Kron is killed by the Carnotaurus, while attempting to climb over the rocks alone.
 Julianna Margulies as Neera, Kron's sister. She is a sensible and compassionate Iguanodon who later becomes Aladar's mate. At the end of the film, Neera and the herd abandon Kron, in order to follow Aladar.
 Peter Siragusa as Bruton, Kron's Altirhinus lieutenant. He is harsh and sarcastic, but eventually repents when Plio shows care for him.
 Joan Plowright as Baylene, an elderly, dainty and kindhearted Brachiosaurus, who is the last known of her kind after the meteor.
 Della Reese as Eema, a wizened, elderly and slow-moving Styracosaurus. Her snarky attitude and dry humor serve as comic relief during the film.

Production

Development

After founding his own namesake studio, special effects artist Phil Tippett directed Prehistoric Beast (1984), an experimental animated short film in which a Centrosaurus is stalked by a Tyrannosaurus. Tippett's skill at creating go motion animated creatures led to the 1985 CBS animated documentary Dinosaur!. A year later, Tippett was hired to work on the special effects team for RoboCop (1987). During filming, in December 1986, Tippett recalled, "When Jon Davison and I were shooting the live-action plates where ED-209 falls down the stairs, there was some kind of delay. Peter Weller's shoes didn't fit. so we had to wait for someone to get the right stunt shoes." Frustrated by the delay, Tippett suggested to Paul Verhoeven that they should produce a "dinosaur picture". That way, according to Tippett, "[w]e wouldn't have to be held up by actors in robot outfits."

Verhoeven was excited at the idea and suggested an approach inspired by Shane (1953) in which "you follow a lead character through a number of situations and moving from a devastated landscape into a promised land." Veteran screenwriter Walon Green was then brought on to write the script. Verhoeven and Tippett had planned to use stop motion animation techniques such as puppets, scale models, and miniatures.

The film was originally going to be much darker and violent in tone, in a style akin to a nature documentary. The film's original main protagonist was a Styracosaurus named Woot and the main antagonist was a Tyrannosaurus rex named Grozni, with a small mammal named Suri as a supporting character. After Woot defeats Grozni in a final fight, the film would end with the Cretaceous-Paleogene extinction event, which would ultimately result in the death of the dinosaurs. Verhoeven then storyboarded two key sequences and calculated the project's preliminary budget to be $45 million. Verhoeven pitched the project to then-Disney chairman Jeffrey Katzenberg, who gave a counteroffer of $25 million because in Verhoeven's words, Katzenberg felt there wasn't "enough of an audience to justify that cost." The budget disputes led to Verhoeven and Tippett's departure from the project.

In 1990, before Verhoeven and Tippett had departed the project, producer/director Thomas G. Smith became involved in the film, but briefly became the director after they had left. Reflecting on his tenure, Smith said, "Jeanne Rosenberg was still writing the script, but it was in trouble. Disney wanted a cute story of dinosaurs talking, and I didn't like the idea. I thought it should be more like Jean Annaud's The Bear. I wanted to have actual lemurs in it. They actually existed at the time of dinosaurs...We actually located a guy who trains them." However, Katzenberg called Smith to help on Honey, I Blew Up the Kid (1992) in which he was replaced by David W. Allen, who had just finished directing Puppet Master II (1990). Multiple months were spent filming actual lemurs to portray Suri and creating visual development, but Allen's version also fell into development hell. Smith stated, "The thing that ultimately killed it is that Disney knew that Jurassic Park was coming along pretty well, and they knew it was being done digitally. They figured, 'Well, maybe, we should wait until we can do it digitally.

In late 1994, Walt Disney Feature Animation began development on the project and they began shooting various tests, placing computer-generated characters in miniature model backdrops. The idea to use computer-generated backgrounds was considered, but rejected after the earliest proof-of-concept animation test was completed in March 1996. Ultimately, the filmmakers decided to take the unprecedented route of combining live-action scenery with computer-generated character animation. The filmmakers then approached then-Disney CEO Michael Eisner about not knowing how much the project would cost or how long it would take to finish, but that they could fully complete it. Trusting the filmmakers, Eisner decided to green-light the project. However, at his insistence, it was decided early on that the dinosaurs would talk during the film. To accommodate this change, Aladar would be given lips in contrast to actual Iguanodons who were duck-billed.

George Scribner was selected as the director, and he was later teamed with Ralph Zondag as co-director. Storyboard artist Floyd Norman stated that Scribner envisioned the film "to be more than just a struggle for survival. He wanted this dinosaur movie to have elements of fun and humor ... Our director wanted to explore the fun elements of dinosaurs, such as their size, shape, and texture. George also knew that since dinosaurs come in all sizes—what wacky relationships might I come up with? What funny situations might plague a critter of such massive size?"

Scribner left the project to work at Walt Disney Imagineering, and Eric Leighton was brought in as co-director. The new script had an Iguanodon named Noah as the protagonist wandering with his grandparents and a lemur companion named Adam, and a group of Carnotaurus as well as a rival Iguanodon named Cain playing the antagonists.<ref>[[#DVD2|''Abandoned Scene – 'The Grandparents Perish]]</ref> The story dealt with Noah, who had the ability to see visions of the future, foreseeing the coming of an asteroid and struggling to guide a herd of other dinosaurs to safety. Further into production, Noah, Cain and Adam were renamed Aladar, Kron and Zini, and certain aspects of the story were altered further into what was later seen in the final product.

Animation

On April 17, 1996, the Walt Disney Company announced they had acquired the visual effects studio, Dream Quest Images. The studio was merged with the Feature Animation department's Computer Graphics Unit in order to form The Secret Lab. Vision Crew Unlimited provided the live-action visual effects. At the time, the Secret Lab's initial studio was reconstructed from a former Lockheed Martin (former Lockheed) building in Burbank, California. Most of the computers were used from Silicon Graphics and additional machines were installed to create a render farm in order to provide workstations for artists, software engineers, and technical directors. The production team eventually re-located to the Feature Animation's Northside building in January 1997, and animation officially began eight months later, although some preliminary work had already begun.

To ensure realistic CG animation, 3D workbooks were created using Softimage 3D software. 48 animators worked on the film, using 300 computer processors to animate the film. Having aspired to be a paleontologist, David Krentz supervised the character design and visual development teams. He had an orthographic view of the dinosaurs, and his character designs were drawn on paper and scanned into the PowerAnimator software for the modelers to rig in the computers. In the character animation department, the dinosaur characters were first visualized in the computer in skeletal form. The rough character animations were then transferred into three software programs to strengthen the visuals of the characters. The programs were "Fur Tool," which was used for the lemurs and to create feathers and grass; "Body Builder," which was used to create skin and muscles for the dinosaurs; and "Mug Shot," a shape blender that works within Alias Maya for facial animation and lip-synching.

Headed by David Womersley, live-action photography units shot on actual jungle, beach, and desert locations including California, Florida, Hawaii, Australia, Jordan, Venezuela, and Samoa. In order to approximate a dinosaur's perspective, visual effects supervisor Neil Krepela invented the "Dino-cam", in which a camera was rigged on a cable suspended between two -tall towers. With the live-action elements shot and the character animation reaching completion, the footage was moved into the Scene Finaling department. Under Jim Hillin, the effects-compositing team blended 80–90 percent of the live action plates against the computer-animated characters. The lighting department then adjusted the final lighting of the shots by changing the lighting conditions and replacing the skies.

Filming accident
In 1998, while filming live-action footage in Poison Canyon near Trona, San Bernardino County, California, a crew member was killed and another seriously wounded when a camera boom struck a cross-country power line. Disney was sued by the surviving crew member and the deceased's family, and the company was later fined $5,000 for violating worker safety laws.

Music

The film's score was composed by James Newton Howard with vocals by Lebo M, who did vocals for The Lion King (1994). In September 1999, it was reported that pop singer/songwriter Kate Bush had written and recorded a song for the film to be used in the scene in which Aladar and his family mourn the destruction of their island. Reportedly, preview audiences did not respond well to the song. The producers recommended that Bush rewrite it, but she refused. Ultimately, due to complications, the track was not included on the soundtrack.

The soundtrack album was released on May 5, 2000, by Walt Disney Records. Howard would later compose the scores for the Disney animated features Atlantis: The Lost Empire (2001), Treasure Planet (2002), and Raya and the Last Dragon (2021). One track, "The Egg Travels", was heard in many trailers following the film's release, including Lilo & Stitch (2002), The Wild Thornberrys Movie (2002), and Around the World in 80 Days (2004).

While the film got mixed reviews from critics, the film score received universally positive critical reception, with critics singling out "The Egg Travels" in particular as one of the best. For his work, James Newton Howard was nominated for an Annie Award for Music in a Feature Production and Saturn Award for Best Music.

Release
In conjunction during its theatrical release, the film was accompanied by an exclusive interactive dinosaur exhibit center adjacent to the El Capitan Theatre titled The Dinosaur Experience.

Marketing
Similar to the promotional marketing of The Lion King (1994), Disney began the promotional rollout for Dinosaur by attaching a teaser trailer consisting entirely of the film's opening scene to the theatrical release of Toy Story 2 (1999). The same trailer was also included on the home video release of Tarzan (1999), and the Walt Disney Gold Classic Collection DVD release of The Aristocats (1970). A second trailer was later released in March and attached to the theatrical release to DreamWorks Animation's The Road to El Dorado (2000).

To promote the release of Dinosaur, the Animal Kingdom theme park ride "Countdown to Extinction" was renamed after the film, and its plot, which had always prominently featured a Carnotaurus and an Iguanodon, was mildly altered so that the Iguanodon is specifically meant to be Aladar, the film's protagonist, and the plot of the ride is now about the riders traveling through time to a point just before the impact of the meteor that caused the extinction of the non-avian dinosaurs, to bring Aladar back to the present and save his life. A "Dinosaur Jubilee" was held at the Animal Kingdom's DinoLand U.S.A. It ran from May to July 2000 and included interactive games, music, and a display of the replica of the dinosaur Sue.

McDonald's launched a four-week promotion in May 2000. The restaurant chain sold Dinosaur-themed Happy Meals, which included toys such as hand puppets and talking dinosaur figures. It also ran the "Hatch, Match & Win" sweepstake contest in the United States, where customers could collect game pieces with their meals for a chance to win various prizes. Mattel also produced toys based on the film, and the Disney Store chain sold other film-based merchandise.

Home media

The film was released on VHS and DVD on January 30, 2001. It was also released on 2-Disc Collector's Edition DVD that same day. Both DVD releases are THX certified and feature a DTS 5.1 audio track. In December 2001, Variety reported it was the fourth best-selling home video release of the year selling 10.6 million copies and garnering $198 million. It was re-released on VHS on February 25, 2003. The film was released on Blu-ray for an original widescreen presentation on September 19, 2006, becoming the first animated film to be released on the format. It was re-released on Blu-ray on February 8, 2011.

Video games
On May 16, 2000, Disney Interactive released a video game based on the film on a Microsoft Windows/Mac CD-ROM as part of the Activity Center series. Additionally, Disney Interactive released a tie-in video game on Dreamcast, PlayStation, PC, and Game Boy Color.

Reception
Box office
During its opening weekend, Dinosaur grossed $38.8 million from 3,257 theaters, beating out Gladiator by taking the number-one spot. The film remained in the number-one spot until it was surpassed by Mission: Impossible 2 during the following weekend. It grossed $137.7 million in North America and $212.1 million in other territories for a worldwide total of $348.8 million. Although Dinosaur was not a box office bomb, the expensive production and marketing costs prevented the film from breaking even during its theatrical release.

Critical response
The website's consensus reads, "While Dinosaurs plot is generic and dull, its stunning computer animation and detailed backgrounds are enough to make it worth a look." On Metacritic, which assigns a normalized rating to reviews, the film has a weighted average score of 56 out of 100, based on 32 critics, indicating "mixed or average reviews". Audiences polled by CinemaScore gave the film an average grade of "A" on an A+ to F scale.

Roger Ebert gave the film three stars out of four, praising the film's "amazing visuals" but criticizing the decision to make the animals talk, which he felt canceled out the effort to make the film so realistic. Ebert wrote, "An enormous effort had been spent on making these dinosaurs seem real, and then an even greater effort was spent on undermining the illusion". On the syndicated television series Roger Ebert & the Movies, the film received two thumbs up with guest host Michaela Pereira from ZDTV's Internet Tonight additionally praising the vocal performances for the characters. Todd McCarthy of Variety called it "an eye-popping visual spectacle", but later wrote, "somewhere around half-way through, you begin to get used to the film's pictorial wondrousness — to take it for granted, even — and start to realize that the characters and story are exceedingly mundane, unsurprising and pre-programmed." A. O. Scott, reviewing for The New York Times, praised the opening sequence as "a visual and sonic extravaganza that the rest of the movie never quite lives up to. Those scores of animators and technical advisers have conjured a teeming pre-human world, and the first minutes of the film present it in a swooping, eye-filling panorama." Summarizing the review, he later wrote that "[t]he reason to see this movie is not to listen to the dinosaurs but to watch them move, to marvel at their graceful necks and clumsy limbs and notice how convincingly they emerge into sunlight or get wet."

Kenneth Turan of the Los Angeles Times wrote that the film "astonishes and disheartens as only the most elaborate, most ambitious Hollywood products can. A technical amazement that points computer-generated animation toward the brightest of futures, it's also cartoonish in the worst way, the prisoner of pedestrian plot points and childish, too-cute dialogue." Mark Caro of the Chicago Tribune wrote "The action is easy enough to follow, and the screen is never dull. But for a story that takes place some 65 million years ago, Dinosaur is awfully reliant on recent recycled parts." Desson Howe, reviewing for The Washington Post, felt the movie "was somewhat derivative and lacked a narrative arc" and claimed it was too similar to The Land Before Time.

Accolades

See also
 List of films featuring dinosaurs
 Dink, the Little Dinosaur
Fantasia - Rite of Spring

Notes

  Dinosaur is considered to be the 39th animated feature film in the Walt Disney Animation Studios canon. However, this ranking differs in Europe as Dinosaur, along with Winnie the Pooh (2011), are omitted from the canon with The Wild (2006) being included instead.

ReferencesDVD media'''

Further reading

External links

 
 
 

2000 films
2000 computer-animated films
2000 science fiction action films
2000s action adventure films
2000s American animated films
2000s fantasy adventure films
2000s English-language films
American action adventure films
American computer-animated films
American films with live action and animation
American fantasy adventure films
American children's animated adventure films
American children's animated science fantasy films
Animated films about dinosaurs
Animated films about orphans
Animated films set in prehistory
Films about dinosaurs
Animated films about primates
Films scored by James Newton Howard
Films directed by Eric Leighton
Films directed by Ralph Zondag
Films set in deserts
Films shot in Australia
Films shot in California
Films shot in Florida
Films shot in Hawaii
Films shot in Venezuela
Films with screenplays by Robert Nelson Jacobs
Science fantasy films
Walt Disney Animation Studios films
Walt Disney Pictures animated films
2000s children's animated films
Films about impact events
2000 directorial debut films